Asmawi bin Ani (born 25 August 1981), better known by his stage name Mawi, is a Malaysian singer and winner of the Third Season of Malaysia's popular reality show, Akademi Fantasia. His father is a blacksmith in his hometown of Kulai.

Apart from singing, he is currently testing his skills in acting and performing magic acts. He is also a budding businessman.

Discography 
 Best Of Mawi World (August 2005) 165,000 copies sold (Platinum)
 Mawi... Yang Tercinta (November 2005) 126,000 copies sold (Platinum)
 Doa, Berzanji & Qasidah Berlagu (April 2006) 118,000 copies sold (Platinum)
 Mawi Yang Tercinta MTV Karaoke (2006) 55, 000 copies sold (Gold)
 Selingkar Kisah (Kehidupan Seharian Mawi di AF) (2006)
 Satu Dalam Seribu (2007)
 Allah Habeebi (2008)
 Al Haq... Yang Satu – Mawi ft. Dato AC Mizal (2013)
 Namamu Asma'mu – Mawi ft. Jeff A To Z (2013)
 Al Nuraa... Yang 5... Yang 6 – Mawi & Hazama ft. Daly Filsuf
 Kalah Dalam Menang – Mawi ft. Syamsul Yusof (2016)
 Bukan Propaganda – Mawi ft. Syamsul Yusof (2016)
 Menangislah – Mawi ft. Syamsul Yusof (2018)
 Qasidah Untuk Qamilah – Mawi ft. Shahir

Filmography

Film

Television series

Telemovie

Television
{| class="wikitable"
! Year
! Title
! Role
! TV channel
|-
| 2009
| Langkah Mawi World
| Host
| Astro Ria
|-
| 2014
| Ketuk-Ketuk Ramadan (Season 4)| Invited artist
| TV1
|-
| 2021
| Keringat Selebriti| Invited artist 
| Awesome TV
|-
|}

 Awards and nominations 
2005
 Juara Akademi Fantasia Musim 3
 Anugerah Bintang Popular 2005 (Bintang Paling Popular) Anugerah Bintang Popular 2005 (Penyanyi Lelaki Popular) Anugerah Bintang Popular 2005 (Artis Baru Lelaki Popular) MTV Awards 2005 (Artis Paling Popular Malaysia)2006
 Anugerah Bintang Popular 2006 (Bintang Paling Popular) Anugerah Bintang Popular 2006 (Penyanyi Lelaki Popular) Anugerah Bintang Popular 2006 (Artis Berkumpulan/Duo Popular (bersama Jamal Abdillah)) Hits 1 (RTM1/Malaysia) Lagu Terbaik 2006 – "Lagu Jiwa Lagu Cinta" Anugerah Juara Lagu 2005 (TV3/Malaysia) Persembahan Terbaik – "Aduh Saliha" Anugerah Juara Lagu 2005 (TV3/Malaysia) Kategori Etnik Kreatif – "Aduh Saliha" Anugerah ERA 2006 (Penyanyi Lelaki Popular) Anugerah Era 2006 (Lagu Balada Popular – "Kian") Anugerah Era 2006 (Lagu Etnik Popular – "Aduh Saliha") Anugerah Era 2006 (Artis SMS Digi) Anugerah Era 2006 (Lagu Paling Popular 2005 – "Aduh Saliha") Anugerah Era 2006 (Video Klip Popular – "Lagu Jiwa Lagu Cinta" (arahan Mamat Khalid)) Anugerah Planet Muzik 2006 (Lagu Paling Popular – "Aduh Saliha")2007
 Anugerah Juara Lagu 2007 (Persembahan Terbaik – "Angan Dan Sedar") Anugerah Planet Muzik 2007 (Lagu Paling Popular – "Kian") Anugerah Planet Muzik 2007 (Artis Lelaki Paling Popular)''
 Anugerah Bintang Popular 2007.(Bintang paling popular)
 Anugerah Bintang Popular 2007.(Penyanyi lelaki popular)
 MTV Award 2007.(Artis paling popular Malaysia)

References

External links
 

1983 births
Living people
People from Johor
Malaysian businesspeople
21st-century Malaysian male singers
21st-century Malaysian male actors
Malaysian people of Malay descent
Malaysian people of Javanese descent
Malay-language singers
Malaysian male film actors
Akademi Fantasia winners